Giuseppe "Pino" Colizzi (born 12 November 1937) is an Italian actor and voice actor.

Biography 
Born in Rome, Colizzi started his career on stage and in 1960 he got his first major role, playing the title role in a badly received television adaptation of Tom Jones. His career became more intense between the 1970s and the early 1980s, when he starred in a number of successful TV-series and genre films. Since the 1980s Colizzi focused his activities on voice acting.

Colizzi was also a very successful voice-over artist. He regularly dubbed over the voices of Jack Nicholson, James Caan, Richard Dreyfuss, Omar Sharif and Franco Nero. He also dubbed Michael Douglas (a role which he shared with Oreste Rizzini) in a select number of his films. Some of Colizzi's most popular dubbing contributions include Superman (played by Christopher Reeve) in the Italian dub of the first three films of the Superman film series until being replaced by Sergio Di Stefano in the fourth film. He also dubbed Sonny Corleone in The Godfather and Hooper in Jaws.

From his relationship with ex-wife Manuela Andrei, Colizzi is the father of voice actress Chiara Colizzi. He retired in 2015.

Filmography

Cinema 

 Everyone's in Love (1959) - Guest at the Restaurant (uncredited)
 Labbra rosse (1960)
 24 ore di terrore (1964)
 Metello (1970) - Renzoli
 Chronicle of a Homicide (1972) - Commisario Alberto Cottone
 Black Turin (1972)
 Winged Devils (1972) - Hauptmann Bergamini
 I Kiss the Hand (1973) - Massimo D'Amico
 Italian Graffiti (1973) - Salvatore Mandolea
 Il comune senso del pudore (1976) - Tiziano / Magistrate (Ep.3)
 L'ultima volta (1976) - Bank Manager
 Il medico... la studentessa (1976) - Dr. Filippo Cinti
 Jesus of Nazareth (1977, TV Mini-Series) - Jobab / Good Thief on the Cross
 The Bishop's Bedroom (1977)
 Bermuda: Cave of the Sharks (1978) - Enrique
 Brothers Till We Die (1978) - Commissario Sarti
 Vai avanti tu che mi vien da ridere (1982) - Commissario Giannetti
 Notturno (1983) - Captain Corti
 Crime in Formula One (1984) - Mr. Martelli
 Salomè (1986)
 Volevo i pantaloni (1990) - Zio Vincenzino
 Dicembre (1990) - Alberto / Eduardo
 La fine dell'intervista (1994) - Giacomo Manconi
 Tea with Mussolini (1999) - Dino Grandi
 Sei come sei (2002) - Direttore del carcere ("Una specie di...")
 Holy Money (2009) - Giacomo
 Alaska (2015) - Alfredo Wiel (final film role)

Dubbing roles

Animation

Robin Hood in Robin Hood
Charlie B. Barkin in All Dogs Go to Heaven
Narrator in Fantasia (1973 redub)
Julius Caesar in Asterix the Gaul
Skrawl in ChalkZone

Live action

Clark Kent / Superman in Superman
Clark Kent / Superman in Superman II
Clark Kent / Superman in Superman III
Sonny Corleone in The Godfather
Sonny Corleone / Vito Corleone in The Godfather Part II
Matt Hooper in Jaws
Richard Adams in The China Syndrome
Dan Gallagher in Fatal Attraction
William Foster in Falling Down
Mark Forman in Heartburn
Grady Tripp in Wonder Boys
Tom Sanders in Disclosure
Nick Conklin in Black Rain
President James Dale / Art Land in Mars Attacks!
Milo Tindle in Sleuth
Sean McLennon in North Star
Roy Neary in Close Encounters of the Third Kind
Philip Blackwood in Her Alibi
Jimmie Rainwood in An Innocent Man
Peter Mitchell in Three Men and a Little Lady
Jon Aldrich in Folks!
Chris Leece in Stakeout
Bill "BB" Babowsky in Tin Men
Colin Harvey in Battle of Britain
Chang in Star Trek VI: The Undiscovered Country
Atahualpa in The Royal Hunt of the Sun
J. J. "Jake" Gittes in The Two Jakes
Charley Partanna in Prizzi's Honor
Daryl Van Horne in The Witches of Eastwick
Bill Rorish in Broadcast News
Francis Phelan in Ironweed
Harry Bliss in Man Trouble
Benjamin L. Willard in Apocalypse Now
Joe Vandeleur in A Bridge Too Far
Bradford Crane in The Swarm
David Linderby in Ashanti
Charley Fortnum in The Honorary Consul
Sherlock Holmes / Reginald Kincaid in Without a Clue
Private Kelly in Kelly's Heroes
Dave Garver in Play Misty for Me
Jonathan Hemlock in The Eiger Sanction
Mr. Klein in Monsieur Klein
Michel Gerfaut in Three Men to Kill
Choucas in For a Cop's Hide
Roger Borniche in Flic Story
John Reed in Reds
Joe Pendleton in Heaven Can Wait
George Roundy in Shampoo
Nicky Wilson in The Fortune
John McCabe in McCabe & Mrs. Miller
W. P. Mayhew in Barton Fink
Clarence Oveur in Airplane!
Martin Stett in The Conversation
Len Peterson in Jaws 2
James Biggs in They Shoot Horses, Don't They?
Bob Hyde in Coming Home
The Detective in The Driver
Harry in Husbands
Brad Wesley in Road House
Tybalt in Romeo and Juliet
Harry York in Frances
Charles Brubaker in Capricorn One
John Blaine in Westworld
Darman in Prince of Shadows
Stony De Coco in Bloodbrothers
Bill in Days of Heaven
Father Da Costa in A Prayer for the Dying
Lavrentiy Beria in The Inner Circle
Rafer Janders in The Wild Geese
John Shaft in Shaft
John Shaft in Shaft's Big Score!
Logan Sharpe in They Call Me Mister Tibbs!
General Adlon in Meteor

References

External links 

1937 births
Living people
Male actors from Rome
Italian male stage actors
Italian male film actors
Italian male voice actors
Italian male television actors
Italian voice directors
People of Calabrian descent
20th-century Italian male actors
21st-century Italian male actors